The Charles A. Beard Memorial School Corporation, named after historian Charles A. Beard, is a public school corporation located in southwestern Henry County, Indiana and serving Knightstown and surrounding areas. The district was formed in 1963 through the consolidation of schools in Wayne and Greensboro townships. Ripley Township, in neighboring Rush County, would later be added.

Schools

Secondary 
Knightstown High School (9-12)
Knightstown Intermediate School (4-8)

Elementary 
Knightstown Elementary School (K-3)

References

External links 
Charles A. Beard Memorial School Corporation
Corporation Snapshot (Indiana Department of Education)

School districts in Indiana
Education in Henry County, Indiana
School districts established in 1963
1963 establishments in Indiana